Algerians in France are people of Algerian descent or nationality living in France. People of Algerian origin account for a large sector of the total population in France. Some immigrated during colonial rule in Algeria starting in the 1920s, and large numbers chose to emigrate to France from the 1960s onwards due to political turmoil in Algeria.

Demographics                
The 2011 Census recorded 465,849 Algerian-born people.

Migration                              
The migration of Algerians to France happened in multiple waves: from 1913–1921, from 1922–1939, and from 1940–1954. During the years of 1947–1953, specifically, France saw a large influx of Maghrebi immigrants. Legal Algerian immigrants numbered 740,000 between these years

In the 1950s, the French government began encouraging Algerian migration, as a result of pressure from businesses. This pressure was partly caused by the lack of workers in post-WWII France (Germain 23). In December 1958, they instituted the Social Action Fund, which supported African immigrants by allocating 500 million Francs towards Maghrebi immigrant shelters and housing. However, the situation these immigrants in were still unpleasant as a result of their employers, who took them as indentured servants. Thus, they were paid low wages and given little government aid compared to other workers. Ultimately, many of them were deported back to Africa. However, by the late 1950s, France's intake of Algerian migrants began to outnumber those being deported, resulting in a sharp uptick in the French Algerian population.

In the 1960s, Algerians continued to attempt to immigrate to France. Many of these people obtained three month work visas, reflecting their intent to work in France for a short time period before returning home. However, the French government viewed this is as a hostile move, assuming that these immigrants intended to stay in the country permanently. Thus, the government continued to regularly deport Algerians. They were required to have a French address to remain in the country, which most Algerian immigrants did have. However, officials simply didn't believe the authenticity of their identification and paperwork; thus, in the 1960s, the French government deported 5–8% of African immigrants. By 1968, there were 40,000 Africans in France.

Causes of Migration                    
The migratory movement of Maghrebis into France is generally attributed to push factors. There was little opportunity to move freely throughout society in Algeria, so many were motivated to migrate to France for a better life. The presence of a post-colonial economic opportunity gap when Algeria was freed after the Algerian War also contributed to the increase of Algerian immigrants. Additionally, some Maghrebis migrated to France because they would have more political freedom to protest French suppression in Algeria than they would in their Home Country.

History

Role of Algerians in WWII             
From 1943–1945, approximately 200,000 Maghrebis enlisted into France's armed forces. Additionally, an additional ≈100,000 Maghrebis participated in the war effort through working in wartime industries.

Post WWII                             
While Maghrebis played a significant role in France's war effort, their contribution was ignored after the war. Rather, the French government continued their oppression in Algeria, angering North Africans in France and causing the rise of African rights groups. African rights groups include the Algerian Populist Party and the Movement for the Triumph of Democratic Liberties.

Racism                         
In the 1950s, the French government used racism as a tool to delegitimize the efforts of African Nationalist groups. The government used tensions between different groups to depict Algerian immigrants as barbaric in propaganda campaigns. This was massively effective, negatively impacting public opinion on African immigrants. The 1953 survey by the National Institute of Demographic Studies showed that North Africans and Germans were ranked last in sympathy levels for immigrants. This impact is exemplified by a piece published by the L'Aurore, a French periodical, in which it was written:

"In Paris, North Africans are specialists and record makers in the nocturnal attack. The Arab is, quite precisely, the thief who waits on the corner of the road for the late passerby, whom he clubs for the sake of a watch…"

–          L'Aurore, 1954

In the 1960s, this sort of racial propaganda continued with the help of public health institutes. They targeted Algerian immigrants along with other African immigrants from Mauritius, Mali and other countries.  A study, published in 1963, entitled "Black workers in the Parisian region" (Les travailleurs noirs dans la region parisienne), outlined reasons for why, for public health reasons, African immigrants were not beneficial for France:

"They are accustomed to wearing practically nothing in Africa where the temperature ranges from 90 to 100 degrees, and when they arrive in Paris, especially during the cold winter, they are highly prone to catching disease like tuberculosis".

This report also cited Africans' perceived diets as reason to reject them as workers. These public health officials were under the impression that Africans ate only simple foods such as rice and beans, and therefore, could not survive the heavy workload required of them in France. In reality, Africans ate a variety of healthy food and balanced meals. This report further argued that these food deficiencies meant Africans were ridden with disease. Thus, African immigrants in France were required to carry around passbooks with detailed medical information, and were often randomly stopped and checked by French officials.

This type of racial bias showed a resurgence in the late 1980s and early 1990s with the French political party, the National Front. Jean-Marie Le Pen, the leader of the National Front, led with the slogan "Two million immigrants, two million unemployed". Le Pen is also quoted as saying "Yes, I believe in racial inequality… they do not all have the same capacity to evolve". During this time, books with black children featured on the covers were banned. As the 1990s progressed, the National Front's influence grew. The group took political control of the French city of Toulon, and promised to deny housing to African immigrants living in the city.

Ethnic groups

Arabs

Arabs form the majority of Algerians living in France.

Berbers                              

The Berbers in France form a significant portion of the Algerian community in the country.

Jews                                

Following Algerian independence in 1962, most of Algeria's Jews, having been granted French citizenship in 1870, left with the pied-noirs. The vast majority moved to France, and the rest moved to Israel. Today, most Jews in France are of Maghrebi origin.

Turks                              

There are several thousand Algerian Turks living in France, having emigrated or descended from parents who came to the country from Algeria rather than Turkey. Some Algerians with Turkish origins have contributed to the arts, sports and politics in France. For example, Nafissa Sid-Cara, who was the first female minister to serve in the French Fifth Republic as well as the first ever Muslim woman to serve as a minister in a French government, was born into a family of Turkish origin which had been established in Algeria; her brother Chérif Sid Cara was also a notable politician and doctor. Other notable French politicians of Algerian-Turkish origin include Mourad Kaouah who served as the deputy of Algiers from 1958 to 1962. Notable writers include Moroccan-born Leïla Chellabi whose father was an Algerian Turk who obtained French citizenship; Mustapha Haciane was born in Algeria into a Turkish family and currently resides in Paris; and Leïla Sebbar is paternally of Turkish origin through her grandmother. There are also several notable sportsman of Algerian-Turkish origin, including the former pole vaulter and Olympian Patrick Abada as well as footballers Benjamin Stambouli and Mustapha Stambouli. Numerous sources claim that the actress Isabelle Adjani is paternally of Algerian-Turkish origin.

Notable people

See also                               

 Algeria–France relations
 Maghrebis in France

References